Voyager Academy is an elementary, middle, and high school in the northern part of Durham, North Carolina, United States, and is located in Independence Park.  It was founded in 2005.  Current enrollment is approximately 1350 students across grades K-12.   Voyager is a charter school and uses a lottery to admit students.

References

Public high schools in North Carolina
Schools in Durham County, North Carolina
Charter schools in North Carolina
Public middle schools in North Carolina
Public elementary schools in North Carolina